Bruno Urribarri (born November 6, 1986 in General Campos) is a retired Argentine football player, who played as a left-back.

His father, Sergio Urribarri, was elected Governor of Entre Ríos Province in 2007, and re-elected in 2011.

Honours
River Plate
Copa Sudamericana: 2014

References

External links
 El Diario: Un buen motivo
 Argentine Primera statistics
 Bruno Urribarri at Soccerway

1986 births
Living people
Argentine footballers
Argentine expatriate footballers
Sportspeople from Entre Ríos Province
Argentine people of Basque descent
Association football defenders
Boca Juniors footballers
Argentinos Juniors footballers
Asteras Tripolis F.C. players
Club Atlético Colón footballers
Club Atlético River Plate footballers
Atlético de Rafaela footballers
Club Atlético Tigre footballers
Club Atlético Patronato footballers
Argentine Primera División players
Super League Greece players
Argentine expatriate sportspeople in Greece
Expatriate footballers in Greece